Buhoro is an administrative ward in Kasulu District  of Kigoma Region of Tanzania. 
At the time of the 2012 census, the ward had a total population of 60,120.

References

Kasulu District
Wards of Kigoma Region